Beetle Spur is a rock spur  north of Mount Patrick in the Commonwealth Range. It descends from a small summit peak on the range to the east side of Beardmore Glacier. The spur was probably first seen by Shackleton's Southern Party in 1908. The name is descriptive of the appearance of the spur when viewed from the west, and was suggested by John Gunner of the Ohio State University Geological Expedition, 1969–70, who collected geological samples at the spur.

References 

Ridges of the Ross Dependency
Shackleton Coast